Ochelata  is a town in Washington County, Oklahoma, United States. The population was 424 at the 2010 census, a decline of 14.2 percent from the figure of 494 recorded in 2000.

History
This settlement was founded circa 1898 by Thomas Ellis, who had bought 40 acres from a Cherokee land owner named Jacob Dick. Ellis named the community Otis. It was renamed Ochelata in November 1899 to honor Cherokee Principal Chief Charles Thompson, whose Cherokee name was Oochalata. The Atchison, Topeka and Santa Fe Railway reached Ochelata in 1899. A post office was established March 23, 1900, and the town of Ochelata was incorporated in 1902.

Ochelata School District was consolidated with Ramona, Vera, and Oglesby to become the Caney Valley School District. The elementary school is located in Ochelata and the administration, middle school and high school are located in Ramona. In 2013–2014, the old Ochelata School building was renovated and placed back in service with classrooms.

Geography
Ochelata is located at  (36.6003, −95.9804).

Business

Ochelata is home to Lucas Metal Works, a manufacturing company who produces their own line of steel buildings, metal roofing panels, farm equipment, and The Ground Hog Arena Tool, which is used annually at the National Finals Rodeo (NFR).

Totah Communications, Inc. was incorporated in 1954 as Totah Telephone Company, incorporated in Ochelata. The headquarters is still located on the southwest corner of Ochelata and Main St. Totah is a provider of high quality communications services, such as broadband to rural areas in northeastern Oklahoma including Ochelata and sections of rural southeastern Kansas.

Demographics

As of the census of 2000, there were 494 people, 175 households, and 131 families residing in the town. There were 188 housing units at an average density of 768.0 per square mile (302.4/km2). The racial makeup of the town was 72.27% White, 18.83% Native American, 1.01% from other races, and 7.89% from two or more races. Hispanic or Latino of any race were 1.42% of the population.

There were 175 households, out of which 36.0% had children under the age of 18 living with them, 60.6% were married couples living together, 10.3% had a female householder with no husband present, and 25.1% were non-families. Of all households 23.4% were made up of individuals, and 12.6% had someone living alone who was 65 years of age or older. The average household size was 2.82 and the average family size was 3.34.

In the town, the population was spread out, with 32.0% under the age of 18, 9.5% from 18 to 24, 25.3% from 25 to 44, 21.1% from 45 to 64, and 12.1% who were 65 years of age or older. The median age was 33 years. For every 100 females, there were 100.0 males. For every 100 females age 18 and over, there were 90.9 males.

The median income for a household in the town was $37,500, and the median income for a family was $40,781. Males had a median income of $31,250 versus $21,875 for females. The per capita income for the town was $14,365. Of the population 7.1% and 8.8% of families were below the poverty line. Out of the total population living in poverty, 10.5% of those under the age of 18 and 3.1% of those 65 and older were living below the poverty line.

References

Towns in Oklahoma
Towns in Washington County, Oklahoma
Tulsa metropolitan area